The British School Quito (BSQ) is a British international school for students aged 3–18 in Quito, Ecuador. It was founded by Gloria Hooper, Baroness Hooper and the former British Ambassador in Ecuador Richard Lavers in 1995.

In Years 12 and 13, the school offers the accredited IB Diploma Programme.  The British School is the only school in Quito to offer, in English, all of the “Higher Level” IB programmes of Mathematics, Physics, Chemistry and Biology.

The school curriculum is taught in English. The curriculum is the British National curriculum from Key Stage 1 to Key Stage 4, this includes the internationally recognised Cambridge iGCSE examinations. The school teaches Spanish, has a Spanish as a Second Language department, English as an Additional Language department, and geography.

History
The British School of Quito was conceived by Ambassador Richard Lavers in 1994 when he arrived to find that Ecuador was one of two countries in South America without a British school.

The school was created under a bilateral agreement signed on 9 June 1995 by the Government of the Republic of Ecuador and Her Majesty’s Government in the United Kingdom.  This agreement established The British School Quito with the Foreign Ministry of Ecuador, within the framework of a broader cultural agreement between the two countries.

In September 1995, BSQ started with 26 pupils. Sylvia Harcourt, current President of the Board of Trustees,  was a member of the school community from its very beginning.

From 1995 to 1997, numbers  increased dramatically to the point that the school had to move to larger premises in Tumbaco.

During 1999, the school built the classroom block below the swimming pool, purchased several prefabricated classroom buildings and modified the main building.

Student Council
Each year students from high school vote for The British School Student Council. The BSSC is a group of representatives for high school that run activities and organize events in the school and outside it. Candidates from the Student Council come from Year 11 to Year 13.

Student Council organised events have included Fiestas de Quito with the ‘Cuarenta’, Valentine’s Day and Jeans Day. The money raised in these events helped non-governmental organisations and charities like The Book Bus, Hospital ‘Baca Ortiz’ and ‘Mother Teresa’Retirement House.

The Student Council has membership of the ‘Red de Consejos Estudiantiles’ (Student Councils Network). The ‘Inter-Schools Rose Mail’ was the first event coordinated with other student councils for Valentine’s Day.

Future projects include the design of 'hoodies' to supplement the school uniform and the improvement of the Secondary Library by equipping it with better technology.

Artistic support
Each year the school in conjunction with the Secondary students drama company - Tiny Piano Productions - organise the annual dramatic production. Students have performed plays such as: Romeo and Juliet, Casablanca, One Flew Over the Cuckoo's Nest, The Crucible and Rope.

References

External links
 School website
 International Baccalaureate webpage
 Council of International School website
 Tiny Piano Productions webpage

Bibliography 
 http://www.britishschoolquito.edu.ec/british.php?c=1244

Secondary schools in Quito
International Baccalaureate schools in Ecuador
International schools in Quito
Private schools in Ecuador
Educational institutions established in 1995
Ecuador–United Kingdom relations
1995 establishments in Ecuador